Israeli rock (Rok Yisra'eli) is rock music created by Israeli bands and singers.

History

1960s

Israel's initial attitude toward rock music was extremely negative.  Israeli musicians of the time believed that it was a trend that would soon pass. The first Israeli rock bands began performing in the mid-1960s in nightclubs and discos, first in Ramla and later on HaMasger Street in Tel Aviv. These bands mainly performed cover versions of popular rock songs by bands like The Beatles and The Shadows. Rock culture, in the social and political sense, was nowhere in sight. Bands that stood out in the first wave of Israeli rock were The Lions, The Churchills, The Fat and the Thins, The Styles, The Electric Stage, The Seventh Radiance, The Goldstars, The Sing-Sing, The Blue Stars and The Spiders.

In the euphoria that followed the Six-Day War, the performing groups of the Israel Defense Forces rose in status with a steady stream of songs about victory, bereavement and loss. Rock became part of the alternative music scene that was played mostly in clubs such as "Hakarish" and "Calypso", formerly known as drug dens.

Near the end of the decade rock and roll gained legitimacy. Western musicians arrived in Israel, and influences of the pop revolution permeated local culture. Some of the local bands added English musicians to their ensemble, creating several new bands that were based on the original rhythm bands. In the second wave of rhythm bands, three main bands led the local rock scene. The first was The Churchills, which consisted of five musicians including Canadian singer Stan Solomon, and British guitarist Robb Huxley.  These were the most adventurous of the Israeli rock bands; they played innovative combinations of psychedelic rock mixed with Mediterranean Arab music. In 1970 the Israeli composer Noam Sheriff initiated a concert played by the Israel Philharmonic Orchestra and The Churchills, and their shared work with Arik Einstein, Oshik Levi and other artists from the mainstream Israeli pop music scene granted the Israeli rock scene a public stamp of approval. The second band, The Lions, was considered to be the first Israeli band to experiment with reggae music.

The third prominent Israeli band of those years was the supergroup Uzi and the Styles, created by the former lead singer of The Fat and the Thins, Uzi Fox. The band's varied style was derived from British pop and American soul music and was characterized by the compound-rich processings of wind instruments that resembled Blood, Sweat & Tears, Chicago, etc.

Between the 1960s and the 1970s, successful Israeli musicians showed interest in rock music, and many of them recorded songs in the rock style by themselves or with bands. The artist who took the most significant step towards the adoption of rock as a dominant force in Israeli music was the popular singer Arik Einstein, who in 1969 made The Churchills his backup group. Einstein's albums from those years, Pozi (1969), slug (1970), Plastelina (1970) and Badshe etzel Avigdor (1971) are considered to be groundbreaking in the way in which they combined rock melodies with Hebrew texts. They demonstrated fresh musical perception and created more personal mainstream songs rather than those of the military bands that dominated the previous decade.

1970s
In the early 1970s, Israel had a burgeoning progressive rock scene.  One of the first performers was Shlomo Gronich, whose 1971 debut was Why Didn't You Tell Me?. Danny Ben Israel's Bullshit 3 was released in 1970, but overlooked for some thirty years.  Other 70s prog bands included The Churchills, Zingale, and Sheshet.

Many bands formed in this decade. The rock band Tamouz gained much success in the 1970s. The most successful Israeli Rock band of the seventies was Kaveret which combined rock music and a unique sense of humor.  The (consecutive 1st prize) winners of the 1976, 1977, and 1978 Chassidic Song Festival was the band that invented Jewish Rock, The Diaspora Yeshiva Band, who made several albums, had many hits (Hafachta, Malchutcha, Ivdu), and toured worldwide including Carnegie Hall and Lincoln Center.
At decade's end, singers who performed rock music became very popular and successful, including Shalom Hanoch, Ariel Zilber, Svika Pick (in combination with pop music), Efraim Shamir, Yitzhak Klepter and Gary Eckstein.

1980s

During the 1980s a few rock bands became popular. Notable rock bands of the decade were The Click, Benzin, T-Slam, and Mashina which became the most successful Israeli rock band of the decade.

1990s

In 1991 Israeli alternative rock bands and singers broke through, led by Rami Fortis, Berry Sakharof and Aviv Geffen, and young bands like Eifo HaYeled, The Elders of Zfat, Rockfour and Dr. Kasper's Rabbits Show who became very popular. An essential role in the rise of these bands and artists was the former Roxanne club in Tel Aviv, which hosted known artists and emerging artists of rock and alternative rock, exposing new bands to a growing audience. Since then, most of those bands have disbanded, but their members still continue to act in various music projects and mostly constitute the community of the Israeli music of the 2010s.

Notable in the field of Glam metal and Heavy metal was the band "Stella Maris" from Haifa, which began performing in the early 1990s. Stella Maris later integrated in the mainstream Israeli music scene and its vocalist, Pavlo Rosenberg, launched a solo career of his own.

Israel also developed a new style of rock/metal named Oriental metal, a crossover between death metal and doom metal, influenced by ancient Jewish traditions and the oriental culture both in lyrics and melody.

Two mid-1990s crises led to the decline of that early 1990s rock boom: First was the Arad festival disaster of July 1995, after which the popularity of these events declined. Then the nationally traumatic murder of Prime Minister Yitzhak Rabin in November that year, is largely considered to have shifted the whole cultural atmosphere of the country, and the prominence and success of the "kicking" rock of the early 1990s was replaced by more mellow directions. Yet, until the end of that decade, Israeli rock music kept its place as a central musical style, and important bands such as Hamachshefot and Monica Sex formed.

2000s 

Although Israeli rock became less popular in the 2000s, being edged out by Israeli pop, many new rock artists and bands emerged. Among the most prominent Israel rock bands of the 2000s are Beit HaBubot, playing melodic rock which focused on acoustic guitar, and Synergia, which had a melodic nu metal sound. Among the other successful emerging Israeli rock bands and artists of this decade were Girafot, Sheygets, HaYehudim, Yoni Bloch, Hadag Nahash, Shy Nobleman, Vaadat Charigim and many more.

Many disbanded Israel rock bands began playing again during this decade, including T-Slam, Mofa Ha'arnavot Shel Dr. Kasper, Mercedes Band, Eifo HaYeled, Monica Sex, Mashina, etc.

At the end of the 2000s Mizrahi music gained massive popularity in Israel, further weakening the popularity of Israeli rock.

See also

 List of Israeli rock singers
 List of Israeli rock music groups
 Rock Mizrahi
 Music of Israel
 List of Israeli musical artists

References

Israeli music
Music scenes
Rock music by country